Robert Harley Williams (21 August 1931 – 10 September 2017) was a Canadian rower. He competed at the 1952 Summer Olympics in Helsinki in the men's double sculls with Derek Riley where they were eliminated in the round one repechage.

References

1931 births
2017 deaths
Canadian male rowers
Olympic rowers of Canada
Rowers at the 1952 Summer Olympics
Rowers from Hamilton, Ontario
Commonwealth Games bronze medallists for Canada
Commonwealth Games medallists in rowing
Rowers at the 1954 British Empire and Commonwealth Games
Medallists at the 1954 British Empire and Commonwealth Games